The 2018 Empire Slovak Open was a professional tennis tournament played on outdoor clay courts. It was the tenth edition of the tournament and was part of the 2018 ITF Women's Circuit. It took place in Trnava, Slovakia, on 14–20 May 2018.

Singles main draw entrants

Seeds 

 1 Rankings as of 7 May 2018.

Other entrants 
The following players received a wildcard into the singles main draw:
  Tereza Mihalíková
  Lenka Stará
  Rebecca Šramková
  Vera Zvonareva

The following players received entry from the qualifying draw:
  Maja Chwalińska 
  Vivien Juhászová
  Tereza Martincová 
  Anastasia Potapova

The following player received entry as a lucky loser:
  Irina Falconi
  Claire Liu

Champions

Singles

 Viktória Kužmová def.  Verónica Cepede Royg, 6–4, 1–6, 6–1

Doubles
 
 Jessica Moore /  Galina Voskoboeva def.  Xenia Knoll /  Anna Smith, 0–6, 6–3, [10–7]

External links 
 Official website
 2018 Empire Slovak Open at ITFtennis.com

2018 ITF Women's Circuit
2018 in Slovak tennis
Tennis tournaments in Slovakia